is a Japanese fantasy light novel series  written by Miya Kazuki and illustrated by You Shiina. It was serialized online from September 2013 to March 2017 on the user-generated novel publishing website Shōsetsuka ni Narō. It was later acquired by TO Books, who has published thirty-one volumes since January 2015.

A manga adaptation of the first part with art by Suzuka was serialized online via Niconico Seiga website from October 2015 to July 2018. It was collected in seven tankōbon volumes by TO Books. Both the light novel and manga are published in English by J-Novel Club. An anime television series adaptation produced by Ajia-do Animation Works aired the first part from October to December 2019, and the second part aired from April to June 2020. A two-part OVA episode released in March 2020. A third season aired from April to June 2022.

Plot
The story follows Urano Motosu, a book-loving post-secondary college student and soon-to-be librarian who ends up crushed to death beneath a pile of books at her house during an earthquake. With her dying breath, she wishes to be reincarnated in a world where she can read books forever. Urano awakens in the body of a weak, five-year-old girl named Myne in a world where books are scarce and only available to elites. Myne, retaining her memories from her previous life, decides to create and print her own books so that she can read again.

Characters
 

The titular bookworm, Urano (a college student) was on the cusp of being a librarian when she was ironically crushed to death under a pile of books during an earthquake and reincarnated as a sickly five-year-old girl named Myne, but in a world where books are only for extremely rich nobles. Her frailty is due to a rare disease known as the "Devouring," which consists of high fevers that spark whenever the host is stressed or depressed. Now, Myne has to put her book-knowledge to the test in order to become a librarian in her new world.

The High Priest in the city of Ehrenfest.

Myne's elder sister by one year who follows her mother's craft in becoming a seamstress.

Myne and Turi's mother who is a seamstress by trade and works at a dye factory.

Myne and Turi's father who works as a soldier and a guard for the city of Ehrenfest.

Myne's childhood best friend who helps her in her business to make paper and create books. He initially wanted to be a traveling merchant, but after being dissuaded by Otto, he decides to work with Myne and be the muscle to her brain. He is the first to suspect that Myne is not who she used to be and has been in fact taken over by someone else.

A former traveling merchant and now soldier and military accountant of Ehrenfest. He teaches Myne how to read and write the language of the new world.

A city merchant who takes Myne and Lutz under his wing and helps them grow their bookmaking business. After realizing the potential Myne and Lutz have at their craft, he is insistent on training them to be merchants and argues against others who want the pair for themselves.

An assistant at Benno's store who helps Myne and Lutz on their journey.

The head of the Merchant Guild in Ehrenfest and Benno's senior. He agrees to allow Lutz and Myne to become temporarily registered merchants after seeing the products the duo are able to create.

Gustav's granddaughter who wants to buy one of Myne's hairpins to wear at her baptism. Like Myne, she has the incurable illness known as the "Devouring."

A young grey-robed boy who is placed as Myne's retainer. He is pompous, brash, and believes himself superior to Myne, even though he is beneath her in the temple hierarchy. He eventually comes around and serves Myne faithfully after she shows him kindness and compassion.

A grey-robed young man who is placed as Myne's retainer. He is quiet, follows the rules, and is highly devoted to the temple. He is the first retainer to earn Myne's trust and becomes her right-hand man.

 A young grey-robed girl who is placed as Myne's retainer. She is out to annoy and frustrate Myne on the High Bishop's orders, hoping she will grow up to be his concubine if she's successful. After Myne threatens to send her back to the orphanage, she changes her ways and serves Myne faithfully but still retains her snarky attitude.

He is the third of four brothers, and the older brother of Lutz.

Media

Light novels
Ascendance of a Bookworm was originally published by Miya Kazuki as a free-to-read web novel on Shōsetsuka ni Narō in 2013 until it was acquired by TO Books which published the first volume in print in their TO Bunko imprint with illustrations by You Shiina in January 2015. As of August 2022, the series will have accumulated over 30 volumes, divided into five parts. The light novel is published in English by J-Novel Club. In May 2019, J-Novel Club released the first official English translation of Part 1 volume 1.

Volume list

|}

Manga
A manga adaptation was published by TO Books and follows similar format as the novels. Part 1, subtitled , was illustrated by Suzuka, serialized in Comic Corona from October 2015 to July 2018, and was compiled into a total of seven volumes. Suzuka continued to illustrate Part 2 subtitled  which began serialization in Comic Corona on September 24, 2018 and currently has a total of eight volumes. Part 3 subtitled  is illustrated by Ryo Namino and began serialization in Comic Corona despite Part 1 still being ongoing at the time. Part 3 currently has six volumes. Part 4 is illustrated by Hikaru Katsuki and began serialization on December 24, 2020 also in Comic Corona and currently has a total of five volumes. The manga adaptation is also published in English by J-Novel Club.

Part 1

Part 2

Part 3

Part 4

Anime

An anime television series adaptation was announced on March 7, 2019. The series is animated by Ajia-do Animation Works and directed by Mitsuru Hongo, with Mariko Kunisawa handling series composition, Yoshiaki Yanagida and Toshihisa Kaiya designing the characters, and Michiru composing the series' music.

The first part ran for 14 episodes, which aired from October 3 to December 26, 2019, on ABC, Tokyo MX, Wowow, and BS Fuji, and covers Part 1: Daughter of a Soldier of the light novel. Sumire Morohoshi performed the series' opening theme song , while Megumi Nakajima performed the series' ending theme song . A two-part OVA series (numbered collectively as episode 14.5, both airing on March 9, 2020) consisted of two parts titled "Eustachius's Incognito Operation Downtown" and "Visiting Missus Corinna".

The second part ran for 12 episodes, which aired from April 5 to June 21, 2020, and covers Volumes 1 and 2 of Part 2: Apprentice Shrine Maiden of the light novel. Sumire Morohoshi also performed the second part's opening theme song  (Commotion), while Minori Suzuki performs the ending theme "Ephemera wo Atsumete".

The production of a third season was announced on July 12, 2020, which ran for 10 episodes and aired from April 12 to June 14, 2022 on ytv, and covers Volumes 3 and 4 of Part 2: Apprentice Shrine Maiden of the light novel. Nao Tōyama performed the third season's opening theme song , while Maaya Sakamoto performed the ending theme song .

Crunchyroll licensed the series and has partnered with Sentai Filmworks for distribution in North America.

Other
Six fanbooks were published by TO Books and released on December 20, 2016, December 9, 2017, November 10, 2018, November 9, 2019, November 10, 2020, and November 10, 2021. TO Books also published seven Drama CDs released on September 9, 2017, June 9, 2018, June 10, 2019, December 10, 2019, September 10, 2020, August 10, 2021, and April 9, 2022.

Reception
The series has sold over 8 million copies across physical and digital sales combined as of October 31, 2022. The series ranked fifth in 2017, first in 2018 and 2019, second in 2020 and 2021, and third in 2022 in Takarajimasha's annual light novel guide book Kono Light Novel ga Sugoi!, in the tankōbon category.

The 2nd season of anime was nominated for "Best Fantasy" in 2021's Crunchyroll Anime Awards.

Notes

References

External links
  at Shōsetsuka ni Narō 
  
  
  
  
  
  
 

2019 anime television series debuts
2020 anime television series debuts
2015 Japanese novels
Ajia-do Animation Works
Anime and manga based on light novels
Asahi Broadcasting Corporation original programming
Crunchyroll anime
Fiction about reincarnation
Isekai anime and manga
Isekai novels and light novels
Japanese webcomics
J-Novel Club books
Light novels
Light novels first published online
Muse Communication
Novels about reincarnation
Television shows about reincarnation
Shōjo manga
Sentai Filmworks
Shōsetsuka ni Narō
Webcomics in print